Mateusz Żukowski (born 23 November 2001) is a Polish professional footballer who plays as a right-back or winger for Ekstraklasa club Lech Poznań, on loan from Rangers.

Career
On 31 January 2022, Żukowski signed for Scottish club Rangers, on a four-year deal and for an undisclosed fee, reported to be £400,000.

On 12 February 2022, he made his debut in a Scottish Cup match away to Annan Athletic.

On 30 August 2022, he joined Polish defending champions Lech Poznań on loan until the end of the season, with an option to buy.

Career statistics

Honours

Lechia Gdańsk
Polish Cup: 2018–19

Rangers
Scottish Cup: 2021–22

References

External links
 
 

 Mateusz Żukowski  at Lech Poznań

2001 births
Living people
People from Lębork
Polish footballers
Association football forwards
Poland under-21 international footballers
Poland youth international footballers
Ekstraklasa players
I liga players
II liga players
Lechia Gdańsk players
Chojniczanka Chojnice players
Rangers F.C. players
Lech Poznań players
Lech Poznań II players
Polish expatriate footballers
Polish expatriate sportspeople in Scotland
Expatriate footballers in Scotland